Dominique Blanc (born 25 April 1956) is a French actress. She is known for her roles in the films May Fools (1990), Indochine (1992), La Reine Margot (1994), Those Who Love Me Can Take the Train (1998), and The Other One (2008). In a career spanning nearly four decades, Blanc has won four César Awards from nine nominations.

Life and career
She was trained at the French Drama school, Cours Florent. In 1980, at the suggestion of Pierre Romans in whose class she was, Patrice Chéreau went to see her and engaged her for a performance of Henrik Ibsen's Peer Gynt. She remained one of Chéreau's preferred actresses.

One of the most critically acclaimed French actresses, Blanc has won four César Awards. On 6 September 2008, she won the Volpi Cup for Best Actress at the 65th Venice Film Festival.

Filmography

Theatre

Decorations 
 Commander of the Order of Arts and Letters (2015)

References

External links

 

1956 births
Living people
20th-century French actresses
21st-century French actresses
Cours Florent alumni
French National Academy of Dramatic Arts alumni
Best Actress César Award winners
Best Supporting Actress César Award winners
Commandeurs of the Ordre des Arts et des Lettres
French film actresses
French stage actresses
French television actresses
French voice actresses
Actresses from Lyon
Volpi Cup for Best Actress winners
Audiobook narrators